Ragersville is an unincorporated community in Tuscarawas County, in the U.S. state of Ohio.

History
Ragersville was platted in 1830 by Conrad Rager, and named for him.  A post office called Ragersville was established in 1880, and remained in operation until 1955.

Notable people
Nancy Sexton, filmmaker
Alta Weiss, professional baseball player

References

Unincorporated communities in Tuscarawas County, Ohio
Unincorporated communities in Ohio